The Minister of Public Works, Posts and Telegraphs in the French cabinet was responsible from 25 October 1906 to 22 March 1913 for a combined portfolio formerly divided between the Minister of Public Works and the Minister of Posts, Telegraphs, and Telephones.
On 22 March 1913 in the cabinet of Louis Barthou responsibility was divided between the Minister of Public Works and the Minister of Commerce, Industry, Posts, and Telegraphs.

Officeholders

Notes

Sources

Government ministries of France